Ian Robert MacRae  (born 6 April 1943) is a former New Zealand rugby union player. A second five-eighth and centre, MacRae represented West Coast, Bay of Plenty and Hawke's Bay at a provincial level, and was a member of the New Zealand national side, the All Blacks, from 1963 to 1970. He played 28 matches for the All Blacks—three as captain—including 17 internationals.

McRae went on to be involved in rugby as a coach and administrator. He served on the Super 12 judiciary panel between 1996 and 1998, and was elected president of the New Zealand Rugby Union in 2013.

In the 2012 New Year Honours, MacRae was appointed an Officer of the New Zealand Order of Merit for services to rugby.

References

1943 births
Living people
Rugby union players from Christchurch
People educated at Rangiora High School
New Zealand rugby union players
New Zealand international rugby union players
West Coast rugby union players
Bay of Plenty rugby union players
Hawke's Bay rugby union players
Rugby union centres
Officers of the New Zealand Order of Merit
New Zealand Rugby Football Union officials